Arts et Métiers may refer to:

 Arts et Métiers ParisTech or ENSAM, a French elite Engineering institute
 Arts et Métiers (Paris Métro), a station of the Paris Métro
 Musée des Arts et Métiers, a museum of science and technology in Paris
 Conservatoire National des Arts et Métiers (CNAM), or National Conservatory of Arts and Crafts
 Descriptions des Arts et Métiers, a French book
 École Catholique des Arts et Métiers of Lyon, a French engineering school